"Stage Fright" is an episode of the BBC sitcom Only Fools and Horses. It was the third episode of series 7, and first broadcast on 13 January 1991.

In the episode, Del wins a contract to put on the entertainment at the Starlight Rooms, and arranges for Raquel and a club singer named Tony Angelino to perform a duet, unaware that Tony has a speech impairment. The scene when Raquel and Tony perform "Crying" was named the "8th Greatest Only Fools Moment" by UKTV Gold in December 2006.

Synopsis
Raquel is now three months pregnant, and Del Boy has another get-rich-quick scheme when the Starlight Rooms, managed by an old friend, Eric, needs a good act. Del believes that Raquel's previous experience as a singer makes her perfect for the job. Raquel tells Del that her solicitors are trying to locate her ex-husband, and Del successfully convinces Raquel to marry him. He also reveals he is due in court in a week's time for fly-pitching.

Later, at the Down by the Riverside Club, Del and Rodney meet Trigger's friend, "Singing Dustman" Tony Angelino, who has modelled himself on a young Tom Jones and singing – fairly well – to various old women who cheer for him. Although Rodney thinks he is tacky, Del thinks that Tony would be the perfect singing partner for Raquel. He then gets Tony to sign a contract by pretending to ask for an autograph, then tells him all about the upcoming performance at the Starlight Rooms with Raquel. Tony agrees to do the performance, with Raquel as his partner, Del as their manager, and Rodney as their roadie. Tony warns Del that he can only sing certain songs, but Del refuses to listen to his pleas.

The next day at The Nag's Head, Del learns that the Starlight Rooms are owned by a local gangster named Eugene McCarthy, who has been known to nail people to doors. To further complicate matters, the night Raquel and Tony are due to perform is also Eugene's mother's birthday.

That night, Del eventually makes it to the Starlight Rooms after being in court. Eric introduces Raquel, who starts singing "Crying". The audience are captivated, until Tony takes to the stage and sings along. Only then does it emerge why Tony only sings certain songs; he has a rhotacism, causing him to pronounce his Rs as Ws, making "Crying" sound like "Cwying". Del hastily escapes after the song is over, while Rodney applauds sympathetically.

Back at Nelson Mandela House, Del is concerned about what Eugene will do to him, until a humiliated Raquel and a jovial Rodney both enter. Raquel reveals that she and Tony carried on with the performance, singing "Please Welease Me", "Congwatulations", and the "Gween Gween Gwass of Home", followed by a medley of "wock and woll".

Tony shows up for his money, and Del pays him, Raquel, and Rodney. Tony then talks about how his rhotacism has discriminated him, and although he is a talented singer, he can only sing songs without any Rs in them. With that said, Tony gets paid (after hesitation from Del) and leaves, Del gets a phone call from Eugene, who says that his mother thought Raquel and Tony's performance was the funniest thing she had seen, and he wants to book Tony and Raquel on a five-week contract at the Starlight Rooms. Del tells Raquel, Rodney and Albert and then runs out to call Tony back from the balcony and tell him, "Hang about, Tony. I've got you some more bookings. Stick with me, son, I'll make you wich!"

Episode cast

Music
 Maxi Priest: "Peace Throughout the World"
 Roxy Music: "Love Is the Drug"
 Tessa Peake-Jones: "Do You Know the Way to San Jose"
 Philip Pope: "I'll Never Fall in Love Again"
 Philip Pope: "Delilah"
 Simple Minds: "Kick It In"
 Hue and Cry: "Looking for Linda"
 Charlie Parker: "Ornithology"
 Tessa Peake-Jones & Philip Pope: "Crying"

References

External links

1991 British television episodes
Only Fools and Horses (series 7) episodes